K. Linggam (born 2 January 1985 in Malacca) is a Malaysian footballer who is recently playing for Sime Darby FC in the Malaysia Super League. He appeared twice for Brunei-based professional football team DPMM FC in the 2007–08 Malaysia Super League.

References

External links
 

1985 births
Living people
Malaysian expatriate footballers
Malaysian expatriate sportspeople in Brunei
Expatriate footballers in Brunei
DPMM FC players
Malaysian footballers
People from Malacca
Association football midfielders